Bromelia scarlatina is a plant species in the genus Bromelia. This species is native to Ecuador.

References

scarlatina
Flora of Ecuador